Translation operator can refer to these things:

 Translation operator (quantum mechanics)
 Shift operator, which effects a geometric translation
 Translation (geometry)
 Displacement operator in quantum optics